Amomyrtella is a genus of flowering plants in the myrtle family, Myrtaceae, first described as a genus in 1956. It is native to South America, where it is distributed from Ecuador to Argentina.

Species
 Amomyrtella guilii (Speg.) Kausel, Ark. - S Bolivia (Santa Cruz, Tarija + Chuquisaca Provinces), NW Argentina
 Amomyrtella irregularis (McVaugh) Landrum & Morocho - Loja Province in Ecuador

References

Myrtaceae
Myrtaceae genera
Flora of South America